Ecatepec, officially Ecatepec de Morelos, is a municipality in the central Mexican state of Mexico, and is situated in the north part of the greater Mexico City urban area. The municipal seat is San Cristóbal Ecatepec.

The city of Ecatepec is practically co-extensive with the municipality, comprising 99% of the total municipal population of 1,645,352. It is Mexico's fourth most-populous municipality after Tijuana, León and Puebla, and the most populated suburb of Greater Mexico City.

The name "Ecatepec" is derived from Nahuatl, and means "windy hill" or "hill devoted to Ehecatl (the wind god)." It was also an alternative name or invocation to the god Quetzalcoatl. "Morelos" is the last name of José María Morelos, a hero of the Mexican War of Independence. Saint Christopher is the city's patron saint, celebrated on July 25.

Ecatepec is served by the Mexico City metro, by the State of Mexico's Mexibús bus rapid transit lines, and by Mexicable aerial cable car lines.

Points of interest include the newest Catholic Cathedral in Mexico, Sagrado Corazón de Jesús, several colonial era churches, and the Morelos Museum in "Casa de los Virreyes". Mexico's busiest shopping center, Multiplaza Aragón, is also located in Ecatepec.

Geography

The municipality is located north of Mexico City, in the geographical coordinates of North 19º29'23" minimum, 19º40'28" maximum, West longitude 98°58'30" minimum, 99°08'35" maximum.

San Cristóbal Ecatepec, the municipal seat, has governing jurisdiction over the following communities: San Pedro Xoloxtoc, Tulpetlac, Chiconautla, Ciudad Azteca and Villa de Aragón.

The human settlements in Ecatepec de Morelos are located in an elongated valley, spreading from the Valley of Mexico to Sierra de Guadalupe.

Flora and fauna
The municipality is highly urbanized, so most of the local flora and fauna live in the Sierra de Guadalupe. There are no big animals, with the fauna consisting of small mammals like mice, rabbits, gray squirrels and gophers; and birds, such as cenzontles and sparrows. The flora is represented by oyamel pines, oaks, ocote pines, century plants, prickly pears, zacatón (mountain grass) and other.

History

Aztec Era

Remains of earliest human inhabitation of the area have been found on the nearby Cerro (Hill) de Ecatepec.  The area was initially settled by successive waves of Otomis; however, because of the later arrival of Toltec-Chichimecas that dominated the rest of the Valley of Mexico, this area eventually assimilated to the rest of the Valley, ending with its domination by the Aztec Empire. Ecatepec was an Aztec altepetl or city-state in the Valley of Mexico.

From 1428 to 1539, Ecatepec was ruled by a tlatoani (literally "speaker"). The tlatoque (plural of tlatoani) of Ecatepec were closely related to the ruling dynasty of Tenochtitlan.
- Chimalpilli I, grandson of Moctezuma I.
- Tezozomoc, son of Chimalpopoca.
- Matlaccohuatl, whose daughter Teotlalco married Moctezuma II.
- Chimalpilli II, son of Ahuitzotl.
- Diego de Alvarado Huanitzin, grandson of Axayacatl.

Diego Huanitzin was subsequently made tlatoani of Tenochtitlan by Antonio de Mendoza, viceroy of New Spain.

During the Aztec empire, the Mexicas used the town to control trade routes going north.

Spanish rule and Independence
Ecatepec was considered a "República de Indios" (Indian Republic) in 1560, allowing the village to maintain a certain amount of autonomy and keeping the succession of tlatoanis or chiefs. However, in the first part of the 17th century, this was changed to a mayorship, with the Spanish administrating, along with the communities of Zumpango and Xalostoc.

National hero José María Morelos y Pavón was executed in Ecatepec in 1815 by the Spanish Army during the Mexican War of Independence. The house in which he was executed is now a museum, Museo Casa de Morelos.

The municipality was officially created on October 13, 1874. On October 1, 1877, San Cristóbal Ecatepec was declared a village and "de Morelos" was added to its name.

Contemporary events
Ecatepec experienced expontential population growth from 1970, as a result of rural migration to the Valley of Mexico. The seat was declared a city on December 1, 1980, and by 2010, it had become the most populated municipality in the country. Population growth stagnated since then.

The Roman Catholic Diocese of Ecatepec is the newest in the country, erected on June 28, 1995, around the Sagrado Corazón de Jesús Cathedral.

In April 1995, the remains of a mammoth were found in Colonia Ejidos de San Cristóbal, where the ancient lakes of Xaltocan-Ecatepec and Texcoco came together and where the Aztecs build a dam to keep the fresh and salty waters separate. The bones have been tentatively dated to around 10,500 years B.C.

In February 2016, Pope Francis celebrated Mass in the city in front of a crowd of 300,000. The Pope's message was one of encouragement and opposition to the violence and drug trade that permeates the region.

Politics

Demography
Almost all of the population (99.934%) of the municipality lives in San Cristóbal Ecatepec, the third most populous city in Mexico. There are also three rural localities in the municipality.

Economy
Ecatepec is an industrial center. Manufacturing, along with commerce and services, are the main pillars of the economy.

Jumex has its headquarters in the city.

Two regional shopping malls, Plaza Las Américas and Multiplaza Aragón (Mexico's busiest as of 2018), both with multiple hypermarket and department store anchors, are located in Ecatepec.

Infrastructure 
Ecatepec, due to its population density, is one of the municipalities with the highest levels of infrastructure in the State of Mexico.

Roads 
Ecatepec, due to its location, is a necessary path from Mexico City towards several other states in Mexico, such as Hidalgo. Its principal regional roadways are:

 Vía Morelos: a continuation of Avenida Centenario, it starts in the limits with the alcaldía of Gustavo A. Madero and the municipality of Tlalnepantla de Baz. The road crosses several important industrial zones of Ecatepec, such as Xalostoc, Santa Calra, Tulpetlac, and San Andrés, among others. On Vía Morelos several factories are also located, such as that of Jumex, La Costeña, and Agromit. The road ends at the beginning of the Highway to Pachuca, or Avenida Nacional, at the colony of Venta de Carpio, Ecatepec.
 Avenida Nacional: the road begins on the bridge of El Arte, and approximately ends at Avenida Palomas. This road connects with Avenida Hank González and communicates with the México-Tepexpan and Los Reyes Lechería Highways. The avenue continues until the limits of Ecatepec with Tecámac.
 Avenida Central: also known as Avenida Central Carlos Hank González, it begins on the borders with Gustavo A. Madero, and it's the continuation of Avenida Oceanía and Avenida 608. The road crosses the entirety of the zone of Aragón from the Bosque de Aragón, through the colonies of San Juan de Aragón, all the sections of Valle de Aragón, Melchor Múzquiz, Fuentes de Aragón, Jardines de Aragón, and Rinconada de Aragón. Avenida Central continues after Aragón, crossing the following colonies of Ecatepec: Ciudad Azteca, Río de Luz, Industrias, Progreso de la Unión, Alfredo del Mazo, Valle de Ecatepec, Juan de la Barrera, Las Américas, Jardínes de Morelos, 19 de Septiembre, and ends at the Venta de Carpio colony, after crossing the Central de Abastos of Ecatepec, to which it owes the name "Central". Line B of the Mexico City Metro System and the first line of Mexibus run along this avenue. The Avenue is also a part of the Eje Troncal Metropolitano, which connects the south of the metropolitan area of Mexico City (Xochimilco) with the northern part (Ecatepec). Due to its extension, this roadway is often the site of several news reports.
 Avenida R-1 (o Vía Adolfo López Mateos): The avenue begins at the border with Gustavo A. Madero. Avenida R-1 is the continuation of Avenida León de los Aldama, and it crosses several industrial and habitational zones. It concludes at the connection with Avenida Central.
 Anillo Periférico Oriente (o Boulevard Río de los Remedios): This roadway marks the southern limit of Ecatepec with Gustavo A. Madero and with the municipality of Nezahualcoyotl, and it is of great importance for the communication of Ecatepec and Mexico City.
 Autopista México-Pachuca: This Highway begins in Mexico City, but has an exit at San Cristobal Ecatepec and the Circuito Exterior Mexiquense to exit around Los Héroes on the Lechería-Texcoco Highway. It also has a branch that heads to the archeological site of the Teotihuacan piramids.
 Avenida 30-30 (o Avenida Revolución): This avenue is located in the San Cristobal colony of Ecatepec. It begins with a connection from Vía Morelos. The avenue is famous due to its explanada 30-30, where several bands have performed. This roadway communicates with Vía José lópez Portillo, which leads towards Coacalco de Berriozábal, Tultitlán and Cuautitlán Izcalli. The official name of the roadway is Avenida Revolución, but it is popularly known as Avenida 30-30 due to a hardware store named "30-30", which was the site of a public transportation stop.
 Autopista Circuito Exterior Mexiquense: although the highway begins at the limits of Ecatepec with Anillo Periférico, it also has two exits towards Avenida Central, within the colony of Las Américas. This highway is frequently used by drivers to avoid traffic in Avenida Central during rush hour.

Transportation 

Ecatepec is served by Line B of the Mexico City Metro system, including stations Muzquiz, Ecatepec (a.k.a. Tecnológico), Olímpica, Plaza Aragón, and Ciudad Azteca

Mexibús bus rapid transit serving the State of Mexico serves Ecatepec with: 
Line I Ciudad Azteca – Ojo de Agua – Felipe Ángeles International Airport
Line II Las Américas – La Quebrada
Line IV Indios Verdes – Universidad Mexiquense del Bicentenario (Tecamac)

In 2016, a new form of public transportation started serving Ecatepec residents: Mexicable, an aerial cable car whose main purpose is to help residents get around faster (as opposed to being a tourist attraction), especially in areas with numerous hills and valleys without adequate bridges and viaducts. Mexicable Line 1, the first cable car built in Mexico as a form of public transportation, has a length of almost 5 kilometres (3 miles), 190 cars and it takes about 17 minutes to ride along the entire line. Line 1 connects Santa Clara with La Cañada via Hank González station. At Hank González station Mexicable Line 2 runs to Indios Verdes, a main hub for bus rapid transit (Metrobús and Mexibús), city bus, pesero minibus, metro, and regional buses.

Ecatepec is located on Fed 85, the Mexico City-Pachuca highway,  Fed 57/Fed 57D (Circuito Exterior Mexiquense), and Fed 132 (Ecatepec-Teotihuacán highway).

Sister cities

References

External links

  Portal of Ecatepec de Morelos
  Ayuntamiento Constitucional de Ecatepec de Morelos Official website

 
Cities in Mexico
Mexico City metropolitan area
Populated places in the State of Mexico
Altepetl
Aztec sites

1815 in New Spain